The Italian Taekwondo Federation ( or FITA) is the national sports governing body for taekwondo in Italy. It is a member of the Italian National Olympic Committee.

International competition

The Italian Taekwondo Federation is a member of the European umbrella organization European Taekwondo Union as well as the World Association for World Taekwondo (WT).

On the part of the Italy Olympic Committee, the Italian Taekwondo Federation  is the only Taekwondo Association authorized to send athletes to the Olympic Games. Carlo Molfetta became the first Italian gold medalist in Taekwondo.

References

External links
  

Taekwondo organizations
Taekwondo
National members of World Taekwondo
Taekwondo in Italy
National Taekwondo teams